Gilkison is a surname. Notable people with the surname include:

Andrea Gilkison (fl. 1970s–1980s), New Zealand guitarist in the Wide Mouthed Frogs, predecessor of The Crocodiles
Andrew Gilkison (fl. 1770s–1780s), innkeeper and namesake of Gilkison's Corner, Pennsylvania
Frank Gilkison (1877–1955), Justice of the Indiana Supreme Court
Jason Gilkison (born c. 1985), Australian professional ballroom dance champion and choreographer
Jasper Tough Gilkison (fl. 1850s–1890s), Indian Department superintendent involved in the founding of Ohsweken, Ontario
John Gilkison (fl. 1950s), New Zealand businessman in the 1957 New Year Honours (New Zealand)
William Gilkison (1777–1833), Scottish-born British soldier who founded Elora, Ontario